In geometry, the augmented sphenocorona is one of the Johnson solids, and is obtained by adding a square pyramid to one of the square faces of the sphenocorona. It is the only Johnson solid arising from "cut and paste" manipulations where the components are not all prisms, antiprisms or sections of Platonic or Archimedean solids.

Johnson uses the prefix spheno- to refer to a wedge-like complex formed by two adjacent lunes, a lune being a square with equilateral triangles attached on opposite sides. Likewise, the suffix -corona refers to a crownlike complex of 8 equilateral triangles. Finally, the descriptor augmented implies that another polyhedron, in this case a pyramid, is adjointed. Joining both complexes together with the pyramid results in the augmented sphenocorona.

Cartesian coordinates 
To calculate Cartesian coordinates for the augmented sphenocorona, one may start by calculating the coordinates of the sphenocorona. Let k ≈ 0.85273 be the smallest positive root of the quartic polynomial

 

Then, Cartesian coordinates of a sphenocorona with edge length 2 are given by the union of the orbits of the points

 

under the action of the group generated by reflections about the xz-plane and the yz-plane. Calculating the centroid and the normal unit vector of one of the square faces gives the location of its last vertex as

One may then calculate the surface area of a snub square of edge length a as

and its volume as

References

External links
 

Johnson solids